Szeligi  is a village in the administrative district of Gmina Słupno, within Płock County, Masovian Voivodeship, in east-central Poland.

Szeligi is one of the older villages in the area, as an early medieval Slavic stronghold existed at the site already in the 6th–7th century. In the past the village was divided into two parts, called Szeligi Duże ("Big Szeligi") and Szeligi Małe ("Little Szeligi").

References

Villages in Płock County
Populated places established in the 6th century